Berdyanka or Berdianka may refer to:

Berdyanka River (Бердянка), Orenburg Oblast, Russia
Berdyanka Tract, part of Berdyanskyi State Reserve (:uk:Бердянський заказник) in Amvrosiivka Raion, Ukraine
Berdyanka, Luhansk Oblast, a village in Ukraine (:uk:Бердянка (Слов'яносербський район))
Berdyanka, Kharkiv Oblast, a village in Ukraine (:uk:Бердянка (Зачепилівський район))